Edwin Gebauer (born 16 June 1884 in Borna, Leipzig - date of death unknown) was a German politician and member of the Nazi Party.

From a rural background, Gebauer worked on the family poultry farm and at their forge before serving in the First World War with the Fuß-Artillerie-Regiment Nr. 12. He was awarded the Iron Cross Second Class and the Friedrich-August-Medal for his war service.

He became involved in rightist politics in 1924 and joined the Nazi Party at an unknown date. He became a Director in the Sturmabteilung in 1926, achieving the rank of Sturmbannführer in 1931 and Standartenführer in 1937.

In the July 1932 election to the Reichstag he was elected to serve as a member for Wahlkreis 3 (Potsdam II) representing the Nazis. He was not re-elected in November 1932 when the Nazis suffered a sizeable decline in their vote.

References

1884 births
Year of death missing
Nazi Party politicians
Members of the Reichstag of the Weimar Republic
Sturmabteilung officers
People from Borna
German Army personnel of World War I
Recipients of the Iron Cross (1914), 2nd class